Rosyth Sharks is a rugby union club based in Rosyth, Scotland.

History

The club known as Fife Southern was created in 1999 when two rugby clubs merged. The Rosyth and District rugby club merged with Dalgety Bay rugby club that year.

The Fife Southern club later rebranded as Rosyth Sharks. This change of name was incorporated with Companies House on 25 July 2017.

The Rosyth Sharks state the reason why they changed the name: "In 2018 the club took the decision to rebrand to Rosyth Sharks RFC as we were the only team plying in the SRU leagues whose name had no affiliation to the town in which it called home."

In March 2021, local youths were charged when they set fire to the clubhouse of the rugby club.

The club organised a fundraiser to repair the clubhouse and raised over £7,000 in 24 hours. By the time the fundraiser closed at the start of July they had raised over £9,000.

Sides

The club has training nights on Tuesday & Thursday 6:30-7:30pm.

Owing to the covid pandemic they are not training minis at the moment.

Honours

Mens

 Midlands 5
 Champions (1): 1999-2000
 Caledonia Midlands 3
 Champions (1): 2018-19

References

Rugby union in Fife
Scottish rugby union teams
Rosyth